The 2015–16 Illinois State Redbirds women's basketball team represents Illinois State University during the 2015–16 NCAA Division I women's basketball season. The Redbirds, led by third year head coach Barb Smith, play their home games at Redbird Arena and are members of the Missouri Valley Conference. They finished the season 8–22, 6–12 in MVC play to finish in seventh place. They lost in the first round of the Missouri Valley women's tournament to Evansville.

Roster

Schedule

|-
!colspan=9 style="background:#FF0000; color:#000000;"| Exhibition

|-
!colspan=9 style="background:#FF0000; color:#000000;"| Non-conference regular season

|-
!colspan=9 style="background:#FF0000; color:#000000;"| Missouri Valley regular season

|-
!colspan=9 style="background:#FF0000; color:#000000;"| Missouri Valley Women's Tournament

See also
2015–16 Illinois State Redbirds men's basketball team

References

Illinois State Redbirds women's basketball seasons
Illinois State